The Byzantine and Christian Museum is situated at Vassilissis Sofias Avenue in Athens, Greece. It was founded in 1914, and houses more than 25,000 exhibits with rare collections of pictures, scriptures, frescoes, pottery, fabrics, manuscripts, and copies of artifacts from the 3rd century AD to the Late Middle Ages. It is one of the most important museums in the world in Byzantine Art. In June 2004, in time for its 90th anniversary and the 2004 Athens Olympics, the museum reopened to the public after an extensive renovation and the addition of another wing.

Visitor information 
The gallery is situated on Vassilissis Sofias Avenue 22, down the street from the Hilton Athens. It is housed in Villa Ilissia  designed by Stamatios Kleanthis. It can be reached with the Athens Metro at the Evangelismos station.

Gallery

See also

 Byzantine Art
 List of museums in Greece

References

Bibliography

External links
 
 Hellenic Ministry of Culture and Tourism

Museums established in 1914
Byzantine museums in Greece
Museums in Athens
Religious museums in Greece
Art museums and galleries in Greece
Christian museums
1914 establishments in Greece